Martin Evan Jay (born May 4, 1944) is an American intellectual historian whose research interests connected history with the critical theory of the Frankfurt School, social theory, cultural criticism, and historiography.

He is currently the Sidney Hellman Ehrman Professor of History Emeritus at the University of California, Berkeley. He was elected a Member of the American Philosophical Society in 2019.

Career
Jay received his Bachelor of Arts degree from Union College in 1965. In 1971, he completed his Doctor of Philosophy degree in history at Harvard University under the tutelage of H. Stuart Hughes. His dissertation was later revised into the book The Dialectical Imagination, which covers the history of the Frankfurt School from 1923 to 1950. While he was conducting research for his dissertation, he established a correspondence and friendship with many Frankfurt School members. Leo Löwenthal provided him access to personal letters and documents for his research. Jay's work since then has explored Marxism, socialism, historiography, cultural criticism, visual culture, and the place of post-structuralism and post-modernism in European intellectual history. His current research is focused on nominalism and photography. He is a recipient of the 2010/2011 Berlin Prize Fellowship from the American Academy in Berlin.

He also has a regular column in the quarterly journal Salmagundi.

Personal life
Jay was born on May 4, 1944, in New York City. He is Jewish. He married English professor and literary critic Catherine Gallagher circa 1973; they met in 1970 at Berkeley when she was an English graduate student and he was an assistant professor of history.

Published works
1973 The Dialectical Imagination: A History of the Frankfurt School and the Institute of Social Research, 1923-50
 “The Concept of Totality in Lukács and Adorno”. Telos 32 (Summer 1977). New York: Telos Press.
1984 Marxism and Totality: The Adventures of a Concept from Lukács to Habermas
1984 Adorno. Fontana Modern Masters.
1985 Permanent Exiles: Essays on the Intellectual Migration from Germany to America
1988 Fin-de-Siècle Socialism and Other Essays
1993 Force Fields: Between Intellectual History and Cultural Criticism
1993 Downcast Eyes: The Denigration of Vision in Twentieth-Century French Thought
1998 Cultural Semantics: Keywords of the Age
2003 Refractions of Violence
2004 Songs of Experience: Modern American and European Variations on a Universal Theme
2010 The Virtues of Mendacity: On Lying in Politics
2011 Essays from the Edge: Parerga and Paralipomena2016 Reason after Its Eclipse: On Late Critical Theory2020 Splinters in Your Eye: Frankfurt School ProvocationsSee also
American philosophy
List of American philosophers

 References 

External links
Martin Jay's Faculty Page
An Interview with Martin Jay on the topic of Consumption
History, Experience, and Politics: An Interview with Martin Jay- 
The Modernist Imagination:Intellectual History and Critical Theory: Essays in Honor of Martin Jay, eds. Warren Breckman, Peter E. Gordon, A. Dirk Moses, Samuel Moyn and Elliot Neaman (New York, Berghahn Books, 2009).
 "Pants on Fire: The Straight Goods on Lying - A Conversation with Martin Jay", Ideas Roadshow'', 2015
 An Interview with Martin Jay about his 2020 work Splinters in Your Eye with the New Books Network

1944 births
Jewish American academics
American philosophers
Jewish American historians
American male non-fiction writers
Harvard University alumni
Intellectual historians
Living people
Scholars of Marxism
Union College (New York) alumni
University of California, Berkeley College of Letters and Science faculty
Members of the American Philosophical Society
The Bronx High School of Science alumni
Historians from New York (state)
Historians from California